The men's parallel bars competition was one of eight events for male competitors in artistic gymnastics at the 1980 Summer Olympics in Moscow. The qualification and final rounds took place on July 20, 22 and 25th at the Luzhniki Palace of Sports. There were 65 competitors from 14 nations, with nations competing in the team event having 6 gymnasts while other nations could have to up to 3 gymnasts. The event was won by Aleksandr Tkachyov of the Soviet Union, the nation's first victory in the parallel bars since 1960 and third overall, tying Switzerland for second-most all-time behind Japan's four. Fellow Soviet Alexander Dityatin took silver, while Roland Brückner earned East Germany's first medal in the event (and first medal for any German gymnast in the parallel bars since 1936). Japan's four-Games gold medal streak in the event ended with no Japanese gymnasts competing due to the American-led boycott.

Background

This was the 15th appearance of the event, which is one of the five apparatus events held every time there were apparatus events at the Summer Olympics (no apparatus events were held in 1900, 1908, 1912, or 1920). Two of the six finalists from 1976 returned: silver medalist Nikolai Andrianov of the Soviet Union and sixth-place finisher Andrzej Szajna of Poland. The two most recent world champions, Eizo Kenmotsu of Japan (1978) and Bart Conner of the United States (1979), did not compete in Moscow due to the boycott. Andrianov had shared silver at the 1978 world championships and Aleksandr Tkachyov, also of the Soviet Union, had shared silver in 1979.

Brazil made its debut in the men's parallel bars. Hungary made its 13th appearance, tying the United States (absent from the parallel bars event for the first time since the inaugural 1896 Games) for most of any nation.

Competition format

Each nation entered a team of six gymnasts or up to three individual gymnasts. All entrants in the gymnastics competitions performed both a compulsory exercise and a voluntary exercise for each apparatus. The scores for all 12 exercises were summed to give an individual all-around score. These exercise scores were also used for qualification for the apparatus finals. The two exercises (compulsory and voluntary) for each apparatus were summed to give an apparatus score. The top 6 in each apparatus participated in the finals, except that nations were limited to two finalists each; others were ranked 7th through 65th. Half of the preliminary score carried over to the final.

Schedule

All times are Moscow Time (UTC+3)

Results

Sixty-five gymnasts competed in the compulsory and optional rounds on July 20 and 22. The six highest scoring gymnasts advanced to the final on July 25. Each country was limited to two competitors in the final. Half of the points earned by each gymnast during both the compulsory and optional rounds carried over to the final. This constitutes the "prelim" score.

References

Official Olympic Report
www.gymnasticsresults.com
www.gymn-forum.net

Men's parallel bars
Men's 1980
Men's events at the 1980 Summer Olympics